Fractolatirus is a genus of sea snails, marine gastropod mollusks in the family Fasciolariidae, the spindle snails, the tulip snails and their allies.

Species
Species within the genus Fractolatirus include:

 Fractolatirus normalis Iredale, 1936

References

Fasciolariidae
Monotypic gastropod genera